The Reunion is a 2011 Danish comedy film directed by Niels Nørløv. A Finnish remake of the film, Reunion (Luokkakokous), was released in 2015.

Cast
 Nicolaj Kopernikus as Niels
 Anders W. Berthelsen as Andreas
 Troels Lyby as Thomas
 Therese Glahn as Hanne
 Camilla Søeberg as Jette
 Mira Wanting as Simone
 Lene Nystrøm as Eva
 Troels Malling Thaarup as Ole (as Troels Malling)
 Brian Lykke as Tom
 Mia Nielsen-Jexen as Sanne (as Mia Jexen)
 Signe Skov as Lærke
 Søren Bregendal as Carsten

References

External links
 

2011 films
2011 comedy films
2010s Danish-language films
Danish comedy films